Omorgus vladislavi is a species of hide beetle in the subfamily Omorginae.

References

vladislavi
Beetles described in 2009